A squircle is a shape intermediate between a square and a circle. There are at least two definitions of "squircle" in use, the most common of which is based on the superellipse. The word "squircle" is a portmanteau of the words "square" and "circle". Squircles have been applied in design and optics.

Superellipse-based squircle 
In a Cartesian coordinate system, the superellipse is defined by the equation

Its equation is:

where  is the minor radius of the squircle. Compare this to the equation of a circle. When the squircle is centred at the origin, then , and it is called Lamé's special quartic.

The area inside the squircle can be expressed in terms of the gamma function  as

p-norm notation

Effectively, this is still a "circle" of points at a distance  from the centre, but distance is defined differently.

Fernández-Guasti squircle 

Another squircle comes from work in optics. It may be called the Fernández-Guasti squircle, after one of its authors, to distinguish it from the superellipse-related squircle above. This kind of squircle, centred at the origin, can be defined by the equation:

If , the equation is a circle; if , this is a square. This equation allows a smooth parametrization of the transition from a circle to a square, without involving infinity.

Similar shapes 

Such a shape is very similar but not identical to the squircle. Although constructing a rounded square may be conceptually and physically simpler, the squircle has the simpler equation and can be generalised much more easily. One consequence of this is that the squircle and other superellipses can be scaled up or down quite easily. This is useful where, for example, one wishes to create nested squircles.

Another similar shape is a truncated circle, the boundary of the intersection of the regions enclosed by a square and by a concentric circle whose diameter is both greater than the length of the side of the square and less than the length of the diagonal of the square (so that each figure has interior points that are not in the interior of the other). Such shapes lack the tangent continuity possessed by both superellipses and rounded squares.

A rounded cube can be defined in terms of superellipsoids.

Uses
Squircles are useful in optics. If light is passed through a two-dimensional square aperture, the central spot in the diffraction pattern can be closely modelled by a squircle or supercircle. If a rectangular aperture is used, the spot can be approximated by a superellipse.

Squircles have also been used to construct dinner plates. A squircular plate has a larger area (and can thus hold more food) than a circular one with the same radius, but still occupies the same amount of space in a rectangular or square cupboard.

Many Nokia phone models have been designed with a squircle-shaped touchpad button, as was the second generation Microsoft Zune. Apple uses an approximation of a squircle (actually a quintic superellipse) for icons in iOS, iPadOS, macOS, and the home buttons of some Apple hardware. One of the shapes for adaptive icons introduced in the Android "Oreo" operating system is a squircle. Samsung uses squircle-shaped icons in their Android software overlay One UI, and in Samsung Experience and TouchWiz.

Italian car manufacturer Fiat used numerous squircles in the interior and exterior design of the third generation Panda.

See also
 Astroid
 Ellipse
 Ellipsoid
  spaces
 Oval
 Squround
 Superegg

References

External links

  by Matt Parker
 Online Calculator for supercircle and super-ellipse
 Web based supercircle generator

Geometric shapes
Plane curves
Algebraic curves